Alfred Gadenne  (31 January 1946 – 11 September 2017) was a Belgian politician for the Centre démocrate humaniste and mayor of Mouscron in Hainaut until his death in September 2017.

Death
Gadenne was murdered on 11 September 2017 at the age of 71. He was killed at a municipal graveyard close to his home in Mouscron by Nathan Duponcheel. Local news outlets at first reported that a suspect handed himself in to police and that the motive was unclear. The next day the then 18-year-old man told police he killed Gadenne to avenge the death of his father, who committed suicide in 2015 after losing his job as a local council employee.

References

1946 births
2017 deaths
Centre démocrate humaniste politicians
Mayors of places in Belgium
People murdered in Belgium
People from Mouscron
Assassinated Belgian politicians